Alcest is a French post-black metal band from Bagnols-sur-Cèze, founded and led by Neige (Stéphane Paut). It began in 2000 as a black metal solo project by Neige, then became a trio, but members Aegnor and Argoth left the band following the 2001 release of their first demo, leaving Neige as the sole member. In 2009, drummer Winterhalter from Les Discrets joined Alcest, after eight years with Neige as its sole full-time member.

Since its creation, Alcest has released six studio albums and a number of EPs and split releases. Their fourth album, 2014's Shelter, marked a dramatic shift towards a distinctly shoegaze sound, while their subsequent album Kodama (2016) marked a return to their earlier blackgaze sound. The band are widely credited with pioneering the blackgaze/post-black metal genre, particularly with their 2005 EP Le Secret.

History

Formation and early years (2000–2006)
Alcest was formed as a solo project by Neige in 2000. Soon after, the band became a three-piece black metal outfit, consisting of Neige on vocals, rhythm/acoustic guitar, and drums, Argoth on bass, and Aegnor on lead guitar.

In 2001, the band released a 4-track demo tape entitled Tristesse Hivernale on Drakkar Productions in which Aegnor wrote the main riff of the song "La Forêt de Cristal". Not long after the demo was released, the band once again became a one-man entity, with Neige taking Alcest in a more personal direction. Neige, having originally formed Alcest as an outlet to create cold and raw black metal, moved away from the minimalist approach with the follow-up to Tristesse Hivernale, entitled Le Secret. This EP, released in May 2005, became an introduction to the new concept behind the reformed Alcest.

Souvenirs d'un autre monde and Écailles de Lune  (2007–2011)

After having signed to Prophecy Productions in March 2007, Alcest's debut album Souvenirs d'un autre monde was released in early August of the same year, and drew comparisons with the likes of My Bloody Valentine and Jesu. According to Pitchfork's Brandon Stosuy, the album "isn't black metal at all", and compared it to "a lighter take on Jesu shoegazing".

In August 2007, Tristesse Hivernale was released by Northern Silence Productions as a split with French black metal band Angmar. The band also released a split EP with the French band Les Discrets on 30 November 2009.

Alcest's second album, Écailles de Lune (Scales of the Moon), was released on 29 March 2010. It was a highly anticipated album and was received with very warm reviews from music critics, with AllMusic's Ned Raggett writing that the album "makes the most of its compelling fusion of black metal's theatricality and the after-echoes of shoegaze's propensity for utterly enveloping a listener, even if bandleader Neige approached that sound unconsciously at first."

Les Voyages de l'Âme and Shelter (2012–2015)

The band's third album, Les Voyages de l'Âme, was released on 6 January 2012. The album also received positive reviews from music critics, with The New York Times describing it as "the best example yet of what [the band] can do."

Alcest's fourth effort entitled Shelter was released on 17 January 2014 via Prophecy Productions. It features Birgir Jón Birgisson as producer, Amiina for the string sections, and a guest appearance by Neil Halstead. Stylistically the album is a radical departure for the band, dropping all traces of metal from their sound and fully committing to the shoegaze side of their sound. Neige later said in an interview that "We are proud of it, but I think it was maybe a bit too influenced by other things. I really was obsessed with Slowdive at that time. Shelter still sounds very 'Alcest', but maybe not as much as the other records."

Kodama and Spiritual Instinct (2016–2021)

On 15 January 2016, Neige published "New album. Recording started." on the band's Facebook page. He also commented the album would be "definitively darker." On 16 May, he stated that the album was in the mastering process. On 26 July, the title was revealed to be Kodama, and the release date to be 30 September. Neige has said the album is heavily inspired by Japanese art and culture, as well as Hayao Miyazaki's film Princess Mononoke. Musically, the album is a return to the band's more traditional blackgaze sound.

On 22 January 2019, the band announced that they would start recording their next studio album the following day. They announced on 25 June 2019 that the album would be called Spiritual Instinct and would be released on 25 October of that same year; Neige stated that its the recording "has been a long and challenging process." On 23 August 2019, the band released the first single from Spiritual Instinct titled "Protection". Loudwire named the album one of the 50 best metal efforts of 2019.

Upcoming seventh studio album (2022–present)
On 6 August 2022, Neige confirmed that the band is in the pre-production process of their seventh album.

Musical style and concept 

The band name Alcest originates from Alceste, a character from Molière's play The Misanthrope. Neige decided to use that name because of its "ethereal" sound and its representation of the project's concept; he removed the second "e" to differentiate the band from the play. As a child, Neige had experiences of being in contact with a "far off country", which he generically refers to as "Fairy Land". Alcest serves as the musical adaptation of the memories from this "otherworld". Neige intends for Alcest to be a journey for the listener to this world through his memories. This change in concept was first introduced in Le Secret. Souvenirs d'un autre monde serves as a literal summation of the concept behind the band.

Musically the band's sound has changed over time, beginning with their demo Tristesse hivernale that displays a very raw black metal sound, before evolving into post-black metal. The EP, Le Secret is considered the origin of blackgaze, and the band are widely credited with pioneering the genre. The band's sound is defined by a very atmospheric and uplifting tone, and is described as post-metal, shoegaze, and alternative metal. From Le Secret to Shelter the band drew on both black metal bands like Burzum and Ulver as well as shoegaze bands like Slowdive to create a huge wall of sound effect, using abrasive, screamed vocals, blastbeat sections, as well as fast tremolo-picked guitar passages. Their 2014 album Shelter was a significant departure from this sound, a purely shoegaze album entirely eliminating any trace of metal influence. However their following album Kodama was a partial return to their earlier blackgaze sound.

Members 
 
Current
 Stéphane "Neige" Paut – lead vocals, guitars, keyboards , drums , bass 
 Jean "Winterhalter" Deflandre – drums, percussion 

Current live musicians
 Pierre "Zero" Corson – guitar, backing vocals 
 Indria Saray – bass 

Former
 Ludovic "Aegnor" Faure – lead guitar 
 Argoth – bass 

Former live musicians
 Fursy Teyssier – bass 
 Zoé – guitar

Discography

Studio albums

Extended plays
Le Secret (2005, re-recorded version in 2011)
BBC Live Session (2012)
Protection EP (2019)

Split albums
Aux Funérailles du Monde.../Tristesse Hivernale with Angmar (2007)
Alcest / Les Discrets with Les Discrets (2009)

Demo albums
Tristesse Hivernale (2001)

Singles

Notes and references

External links

 
 
 Interview with Neige 

Shoegazing musical groups
French musical duos
Heavy metal duos
French black metal musical groups
Musical groups established in 2000
Post-metal musical groups
Blackgaze musical groups
Musical groups from Occitania (administrative region)
Nuclear Blast artists